The mayor of Hollywood was an honorary position in Hollywood appointed by the Hollywood Chamber of Commerce. The office primarily served as the master of ceremonies of the award ceremonies for new plaques on the Hollywood Walk of Fame, which is administered by the Chamber, along with other community events.

History
The position was created to promote show business events in Hollywood. The legal mayor of the area is the mayor of Los Angeles, because Hollywood is an unofficial district of Los Angeles, California. The unpaid position was previously elected by the Kiwanis Club of Hollywood.

The office has been vacant since the death of Johnny Grant on January 9, 2008. Among those lobbying for the job were Max Worthington, Gary Owens, and Angelyne.  The fictional character Chip Gardner, portrayed by Andy Daly on the Comedy Bang! Bang! podcast and TV show, lobbied for the position.

List of past mayors

References

Hollywood
Hollywood Walk of Fame
Masters of ceremonies